Edward "Curry" Aburrow Jr (1747 – 6 October 1835) was an English cricketer who played for the Hampshire county teams organised by the Hambledon Club in the 18th century. He is known to have played in 45 eleven-a-side matches from 1772 to 1782, all for either Hambledon or Hampshire; 44 of these are now recognised as having first-class cricket status. 

Aburrow was born at Slindon in Sussex between 1747 and 1750, and died at Hambledon, Hampshire on 6 October 1835. He was the son of the Slindon bowler Edward Aburrow Sr. Whereas his father was nicknamed "Cuddy", Aburrow Jr was known as "Curry", which was the name that was often recorded on scorecards.

Considered a "steady and safe" right-handed batter, Aburrow was also an outstanding fielder, said to have been mobile with a strong throw.

Notes

References

Sources
 
 

1750 births
1835 deaths
English cricketers
English cricketers of 1701 to 1786
Hampshire cricketers
Hambledon cricketers
People from Slindon